Mount Isa may refer to a number of related but different topics in Queensland, Australia:

 Mount Isa, a mining city in Australia
 City of Mount Isa, a local government area centred on the city
 Mount Isa City, Queensland, the central suburb of the city
 Mount Isa (locality), Queensland, the locality that surrounds the city and includes the mine
 Mount Isa Mines, the company that operates the mines